Utah v. Lafferty was a 1984 murder case in the U.S. state of Utah. It gained substantial publicity due to the accused persons' statement that the murders were the result of a divine revelation.

History
Ron Lafferty and his younger brother Dan were charged for the throat-slashing homicides of their sister-in-law Brenda Wright Lafferty and her 15-month-old daughter, Erica, that occurred on July 24, 1984. Ron, a self-proclaimed prophet, claimed to have received a revelation from God in which he was instructed to "remove" several people, including the two victims.

Attorneys Michael Esplin and Gary Weight were appointed to serve as "standby" counsel for the brothers when they were charged with homicide in August 1984. They represented the brothers during their competency hearings. At the conclusion of the competency evaluations, and while incarcerated in the Utah County jail, Ron Lafferty attempted suicide in December 1984. This resulted in severe injury and mental damage.  Following the suicide attempt, Ron was held at the Utah State Hospital for several months.

Dan's case
Dan Lafferty represented himself during his trial, although he had access to the standby counsel. The jury trial resulted in a guilty verdict, and he was sentenced to two life sentences to be served concurrently without the possibility of parole. Esplin and Weight appealed the case to the Utah Supreme Court, which upheld his conviction.

Ron's case
Ron Lafferty was found competent to stand trial by doctors at the Utah State Hospital. Ron was tried in 1985, convicted, and sentenced to death. The penalty was upheld after an appeal to the Utah Supreme Court. The United States Supreme Court rejected a further appeal.

The U.S. District Court for the District of Utah upheld the conviction; however, the 10th Circuit Court of Appeals overturned the lower court's verdict and reversed the conviction, finding that the state and the lower court judge had committed error in finding Ron competent to stand trial. The state of Utah filed an appeal with the United States Supreme Court, which was turned down.

Ron was remanded to the Fourth District Court for Utah to undergo competency proceedings. Ron was found incompetent to stand trial, and was sent to the Utah State Hospital for treatment.

Three years later, a court found that Ron's competency was "restored" and in 1996 he was retried for the crimes.  After a three-week trial, Ron was found guilty of a capital offense. Further appeals to the Supreme Court of Utah and the U.S. Supreme Court were denied.

On August 12, 2019, the 10th Circuit Court of Appeals refused to hear Ron’s case by a unanimous decision. Judge Mary Beck Briscoe wrote:

Lafferty has failed to make this showing with respect to any of the four claims on which he seeks a COA [certificate of appealability]. 

The court's decision gave Ron few options left to appeal his execution. Ron elected to be executed by firing squad.

Ron Lafferty died in prison of natural causes prior to his execution date, in November 2019, at the age of 78.

In popular culture
Jon Krakauer's 2003 book, Under the Banner of Heaven, is partly based upon interviews with Dan Lafferty.

An American true crime drama television miniseries created by Dustin Lance Black, Under the Banner of Heaven, and based on the book, premiered on April 28, 2022, on FX on Hulu. Ron and Dan are portrayed by Sam Worthington and Wyatt Russell, respectively.

The Investigation Discovery show American Monster S03E05 entitled "Band of Brothers" covers the case.

References

Murder trials
20th-century American trials
1984 in law
Utah state case law
1984 in Utah
Mormonism-related controversies
United States murder case law
Law articles needing an infobox